The 2012 season is the 100th season of competitive soccer in the United States.

National teams

Men

Senior

Under-23

Under-20

Under-18

Under-17

Women

Senior

Under-23

Under-20

Under-17

Managerial changes

League tables

Major League Soccer (Div. 1) 
Eastern Conference

Western Conference

Overall

North American Soccer League (Div. 2)

USL Pro (Div. 3)

Women's Premier Soccer League Elite

U.S. Open Cup 

The 99th edition of the annual national championship, the 2012 Lamar Hunt U.S. Open Cup, ran from May 15 through August 8. Sporting Kansas City defeated Seattle Sounders FC on penalty kicks 3-2 for the championship.
The winner qualified for the 2013–14 CONCACAF Champions League Group Stage.

Changes for 2012 
In 2012, U.S. Soccer announced that the field would expand from 40 clubs to 64 clubs, that all MLS teams would receive an automatic berth, and that all 2nd and 3rd tier professional leagues would also receive an automatic berth.

The tournament is a single game, single elimination tournament with random drawings deciding the home team (provided the home team stadium meets USSF standards) for the first round through the quarterfinals. The home team for the semi-finals and finals will be determined through competitive bidding as has been done in prior years.

Tournament format 
Teams from the Premier Development League (16 berths), the United States Adult Soccer Association (9 berths), the National Premier Soccer League (6 berths), and US Club Soccer (1 berth) will enter the tournament in the first round. The winners will advance to the 2nd round where they will meet tier 3, USL Pro (10 berths) and tier 2 North American Soccer League professional teams. The second round winners will in turn meet the 16 MLS clubs in the third round. In the remaining rounds of the tournament, winners will advance in each round until the two teams meet in the finals on August 6 or 7th.

Qualification for the lower tiers of the soccer pyramid was mostly completed by April 29 and the pairings for the first two rounds were released on May 1.

Honors

Professional

Amateur

American clubs in international competition

2011-12 Champions League

Los Angeles Galaxy

Seattle Sounders

2012-13 Champions League

Houston Dynamo

Los Angeles Galaxy

Real Salt Lake

Seattle Sounders

References

 
Seasons in American soccer